Tobler Creek is a stream in the U.S. state of Georgia. It is a tributary to the Ocmulgee River.

Some say the Tobler Creek has the name of Tobler, a member of the Muscogee nation, while others believe the creek was named after William Tobler, who peddled liquor to area Indians. A variant name was "Toblers Creek".

References

Rivers of Georgia (U.S. state)
Rivers of Monroe County, Georgia